Highway 332 is a provincial highway in the Canadian province of Saskatchewan. It runs from Highway 633 near Hazlet until Highway 32 and provides access to Hazlet Regional Park.

History 
Before 2005, Highway 332's western end was at Range Road 3195, before Highway 633 was extended along this route.

Major intersections 
From west to east:

References 

332